Lardini Srl is an Italian fashion house founded in 1978 by then 18-year-old Luigi Lardini, his 21-year-old brother Andrea Lardini and 19-year-old sister Lorena Lardini.

History
The company was founded by the Lardini family in 1978 in Filottrano, a town in the Ancona Province of Italy. It is famous for manufacturing men's tailoring for brands Dolce & Gabbana, Salvatore Ferragamo, Versace, Valentino, Etro and Burberry. Lardini produces a ready to wear tailoring line, which is retailed at its showroom in Milan and three monobrand boutiques outside Italy.

Luigi Lardini is its current creative director; his garments can be distinguished by a signature lapel flower  constructed from wool.

Production
The company produces 1,600 garments per day at its headquarters in Filottrano, Italy. It exports 60% of its annual production.

Boutiques
Since 1978 Lardini has opened five boutiques: Milan, Moscow, Baku, Xi'an and Antwerp. Lardini garments are also sold in Genoa and Chiavari. Lardini has also created a collection with influencer Nick Wooster.

See also 
 Italian fashion
 Made in Italy

References

External links
Lardini Official website

Italian companies established in 1978
Clothing brands of Italy
Clothing companies established in 1978
Italian suit makers
Fashion accessory brands
High fashion brands
Luxury brands
Menswear designers
Privately held companies of Italy
Design companies established in 1978
Companies based in le Marche